is a 2007 arcade-style combat flight simulation video game developed by Project Aces and published by Namco Bandai Games exclusively for the Xbox 360. It is the seventh entry in the Ace Combat franchise, the first game in the franchise to not see a release on a PlayStation platform as had been done with previous titles, and the first game in the franchise to include downloadable content. Like other Ace Combat games, Ace Combat 6 features standard gameplay from the series that mixes arcade flight with authentic flight simulation.

While the game encompasses a variety of licensed, real-world fighter aircraft, the game's story takes place in the series' fictional setting of Strangereal, and details a war between the fictional neighboring countries of Emmeria and Estovakia in 2015; the game's campaign follows the player character, fighter pilot "Talisman" of the Emmerian air force's "Garuda Team" fighter squadron, who joins the Emmerian military's efforts to reclaim their homeland. Unlike other games in the series in which the events are narrated from a single perspective, Ace Combat 6's story is interlaced with cutscenes depicting numerous side-stories told by various figures on both sides of the war, describing their personal struggles and opinions regarding the conflict as it progresses.

While gameplay elements from previous titles persist in Ace Combat 6, the game's main campaign features more extensively detailed missions. New elements include the majority of single-player missions featuring a multitude of objectives to complete, in which players need only achieve a certain quota of these to progress to the later stages of a mission, and the ability to call in support from allied units during a mission. The game received generally favorable reviews on release.

In January 2019, Ace Combat 6 was made available for backwards compatibility with the Xbox One. Players who pre-ordered Ace Combat 7: Skies Unknown on Xbox One received a digital copy of Ace Combat 6, but physical copies also work with the Xbox One. The game was also made backwards compatible with the Xbox Series X/S upon the console's launch in late 2020.

Gameplay

As with other games in the series, Ace Combat 6 places players in the role of a fighter pilot, tasked with destroying foes both in the air and on the ground. The game's main controls are simplified as part of the series' design as an arcade flight game, with players given access to not only a wide variety of licensed fighter jets, but also access to a variety of weapons; alongside autocannons and missiles, planes can be equipped with one of several special weapons for use in engagements, including radar-guided missiles, bombs, and rocket launchers, amongst others. While the player can lock on to foes and switch between targets (dependent on weapon being used), the in-game HUD provides feedback on ammo amounts, damage to the craft, speed and altitude, offers a radar that can be tuned to different zoom levels or display a full map of the combat zone, and provide information on the amount of time left during a playthrough, and the player's current score.

The single-player campaign consists of a total of fifteen missions, in which players must complete a set number of objectives defined in the mission. Prior to starting a mission, players must select the jets and loadout that both they and the AI wingman will be using - aircraft that can be used is limited at the start, though more choice is provided at later stages upon the player using in-game credits earned from their performance in the campaign, to unlock new planes. Unlike previous titles in the series, Ace Combat 6s campaign features missions in which the player takes part in one of several ongoing operations - the majority of missions have several operations, ranging from three to six, in which the player needs to complete a set quota (roughly the majority of operations), in order to open up the final stages of the mission. Such operation primarily focuses on assisting or defending allied air, ground or naval forces as they attempt to complete a key objective, usually by taking out targets assigned to that operation. Completing an operation can sometimes provide a benefit to the player to help with completing the mission, such as providing a frontline base to land at in order to repair and rearm themselves and/or their wingman. In such missions, the player can select what starting position they begin at, thus dictating what operation they want to focus on first, and can alter the radar on their HUD to help them with pinpointing the targets associated to an operation. Along with a wingman that can provided assistance, players can also call in support from allied units to either attack enemies in front of the player or provide covering support - doing so requires the player to charge up a gauge by destroying targets, divided into five segments, in which calling in allied support expends a segment of the gauge.

In addition to the single-player mode, Ace Combat 6 is the first game in the series to offer online multiplayer gameplay. The game includes 4 default multiplayer modes: Battle Royale, Siege Battle, Team Battle, and Co-Op Battle.

Synopsis

Setting
Ace Combat 6 is set in the series' fictional universe of Strangereal, where Earth has entirely different nations, geography, and history. The game's story follows a war between the fictional countries of Emmeria and Estovakia on the continent of Anea in 2015, north of the continent of Verusa. Years prior to the war, an asteroid impact event devastated Estovakia and left it economically and politically unstable, but Emmeria was left unscathed and continued to thrive. Following a civil war, a military dictatorship known as "The Generals" seized control of Estovakia and began a massive military buildup to invade Emmeria.

Players take on the role of Emmerian fighter pilot "Talisman", leader of the two-pilot squadron "Garuda Team". Talisman's wingman, Marcus Lampert, goes by the callsign "Shamrock" and fights alongside Talisman throughout the entire game. Other main characters seen in cutscenes include Lt. Col. Victor Voychek, an Estovakian ace pilot who is reassigned to an intelligence officer role in Emmeria after being shot down by Garuda Team; Melissa Herman, an Emmerian civilian who attempts to find her missing daughter Matilda; Ludmila Tolstaya, an Estovakian civilian who travels with Melissa, seeking to be reunited with her fiancé Toscha, an Estovakian fighter pilot; and "Serval", an Emmerian tank unit consisting of Emmerian soldiers Louis McKnight, Donnie Torch, and Kevin Hobsbawm, who sneak behind enemy lines to rob a bank in Emmeria's capital.

Plot
In 2015, the Emmerian capital of Gracemeria is suddenly attacked by Estovakian aircraft. Talisman and Shamrock, part of the Emmerian forces intercepting the Estovakian aircraft, are assigned together due to neither pilot having a wingman, forming Garuda Team. As the battle begins, Melissa witnesses Estovakian aircraft destroy the bridge that her daughter Matilda's school bus is supposed to be crossing.

The air defense mission is interrupted by cruise missiles launched from offshore and the arrival of ace pilots from Estovakia's elite "Strigon Team" led by Lt. Col. Voychek, crippling Emmerian forces and forcing them to withdraw. Many civilians flee as well, including Melissa, who learns her husband, an Emmerian fighter pilot, was killed in action. Later, Melissa hears Matilda's voice in a radio broadcast from Estovakian-occupied Gracemeria and begins a journey back to the city to reunite with her. Meanwhile, Voychek is reassigned to gather intelligence from Emmerian POWs in Gracemeria, following injuries sustained after being shot down by Garuda Team; however, the POWs only taunt him to "go dance with the angels", a phrase spoken by Matilda over the radio and used as a slogan of defiance by the Emmerians.

Over the next three months, Emmerian forces on the mainland are forced west by Estovakian attacks, supported by their cruise missiles. The surviving Emmerian forces rendezvous at Khesed Island and reorganize to conduct a counterattack against the invasion. Garuda Team supports the Emmerian counterattack, but their advance is once again stalled by a cruise missile attack. Emmerian intelligence determines the source of the missiles to be an Estovakian airborne aircraft carrier, and Garuda Team leads an assault on the carrier to destroy it, distinguishing themselves among Emmerian and Estovakian forces. Meanwhile, Melissa meets and befriends Ludmila, who is attempting to find Toscha in Gracemeria. Elsewhere, Serval begins their push to reach Gracemeria and rob a bank, eventually meeting Melissa and Ludmila and giving them a ride to the city.

During the final push to Gracemeria, Emmerian military command suddenly orders a ceasefire; Garuda Team defies the order and shoots down several Strigon aircraft, and are grounded for insubordination. It is revealed that Estovakia is planning to deploy chemical weapons on Gracemeria in a scorched earth defense, should Emmerian forces reach the city. Offered a chance to redeem themselves, Garuda Team destroys the chemical weapons and is returned to duty. After an intense combined arms battle, the Emmerians manage to liberate Gracemeria, and Garuda Team shoots down Strigon Team's new leader Ilya Pasternak after the rest of the team withdraws. Melissa and Ludmila arrive in Gracemeria and Melissa finally reunites with Matilda, who survived the war by taking refuge in ancient passages under the city with other children and a repentant Voychek, and who were briefly trapped before being inadvertently rescued by Serval under the belief the passages were a bank vault.

That evening, Garuda Team conducts an aerial patrol over Gracemeria, during which Shamrock learns his family was killed in the war and announces his intent to retire. However, the city is suddenly attacked by cruise missiles fired from extreme distances, and Garuda Team intercepts the missiles. With assistance from Melissa, Matilda, and Voychek, the Emmerian military traces the attack to "Chandelier", an Estovakian anti-asteroid railgun repurposed to destroy Gracemeria by The Generals. Emmeria launches an operation to destroy Chandelier; after Shamrock sacrifices his plane to reveal the facility's weak point, Talisman destroys it, ending the war.

Following the destruction of Chandelier, a coup d'état removes The Generals from power, and the new Estovakian government negotiates peace with Emmeria. Ludmila reunites with Toscha, and the two marry in an internment camp with Voychek and Strigon Team attending. Shamrock survives his crash, but the injuries he sustained temporarily restrict him to a wheelchair. As he visits the Herman household to meet Melissa and Matilda, he narrates that peace between both nations had been what they had always been fighting for, and that it had finally come.

Downloadable content
Namco released seven sets of downloadable paint schemes for Ace Combat 6'''s aircraft. These paint schemes modify the plane's maneuverability, speed, armor, and payloads. Among the schemes available were those of previous protagonists, aces, squadrons, and organizations from the series; paint schemes based on aircraft prototypes; markings used by real-life military aviation units such as the U.S. Navy's VFA-103; aircraft with monotone paint schemes each themed to a different color for airshows; itasha designs themed after The Idolm@ster; and a Halloween paint scheme for the F-14D that gives the plane stealth capabilities.

Ace Edge

The Ace Edge is a joystick and throttle controller designed specifically for Ace Combat 6. Produced by Hori, it was only made available for purchase in a special-limited edition package of the game. The Ace Edge package was only officially released in North America and Japan. The price of the package was $149.99 US dollars. The package also included an Ace Combat 6 faceplate for the Xbox 360.

It is called "Flight Stick EX" in Japan. It is very similar to the Saitek X45 HOTAS joystick / throttle system popular with PC flight simulation players. The throttle unit is identical, while the control column is slightly different (likely to better accommodate Xbox button maps). The top of the X45 stick featured two 8-way hat switches, one on the left and one at the bottom, and three thumb buttons above them with one under a safety cover; the Ace Edge retains the left 8-way hat switch, but swaps the positions of the thumb buttons and the second hat switch, with three of the Xbox controller's four main buttons in a rearranged order (Y, B and X, left to right, A being the trigger) below an analog mini-stick rather than a second hat switch. The stick also featured both a flexible sleeve over the shaft and spring, and a wrist pad, neither present on the Saitek X45.

Reception

The game received generally positive reviews from critics, albeit slightly lower than the previous games. Game review aggregators GameRankings and Metacritic gave the game a rating of 81.57% and 80/100, respectively.

TeamXbox gave it an 8.8/10 rating, while X-Play rated it a 4/5. In part due to its Xbox 360 exclusivity, the game only sold 700,000 copies, the lowest of any mainline entry in the Ace Combat'' series.

Notes

References

External links

Ace Combat 6 Official Site  
Namco Ace Combat 6 Site 
 

2007 video games
Ace Combat
Combat flight simulators
Bandai Namco games
Video games developed in Japan
Xbox 360 games
Xbox 360-only games
Multiplayer and single-player video games
Video games scored by Junichi Nakatsuru
Video games set in 2015
Video games set in 2016
Video games set in a fictional country